Azadi ( - Āzādī), from Persian, meaning freedom or liberty. The word is used in other Indo-Iranian languages including Urdu, Balochi, Hindko, Kurdish, Kashmiri, Luri, Pashto, Punjabi and Bengali, but is also used in languages such as Armenian and Azerbaijani.

The term has also entered into the lexicon of activists involved with refugee rights, and the rights of the mid-eastern diaspora in the western world, for instance in the Australian film Azadi.

Events 
 Youm-e-Azadi, Pakistan's Independence Day
 Jashn-e-Azadi, Independence Day Pakistan

Places 
 Azadi Sport Complex, a sports complex in Tehran, Iran built for the 1974 Asian Games

Azadi sport complex facilities 
 Azadi Stadium, Iran's national and largest stadium with a capacity of 100,000
 Azadi Bicycling Stadium
 Azadi Indoor Stadium
 Azadi Swimming Pool Hall
 Azadi Five Halls Complex
 Azadi Basketball Hall
 Azadi Weightlifting Hall
 Azadi Volleyball Hall
 Azadi Wrestling Hall
 Azadi Women's Hall
 Azadi Shooting Gallery
 Azadi Artificial Lake
 Azadi Driving Court
 Azadi Tennis Courts
 Azadi Olympic Hotel, Tehran
 Azadi Equestrian Court
 Azadi Karting Court
 Azadi Baseball Court
 Azadi Football Training Pitches

Other locations 
 Azadi Square, the largest square in Tehran
 Azadi Tower, one of the two symbols of Tehran, Iran
 Azadi Museum, a museum inside the Azadi Tower in Tehran, Iran
 Azadi Street, a street in Tehran, Iran
 Azadi Cinema, the largest movie theater (cinema) in the middle east, Iran and Tehran
 Azadi Station, a metro station in Tehran, Iran
 Azadi Hospital, a specialized clinic of psychiatry and psychology in Tehran, Iran
 Parsian Azadi Hotel, 4 star hotel and one of the largest hotels in Iran located in Tehran
 Azadi Square (Isfahan), one of the main squares of Isfahan, Iran
 Azadi, Khuzestan
 Azadi, Kohgiluyeh and Boyer-Ahmad
 Azadi, Lorestan

Miscellaneous

Anglosphere 
 Azadi (film), a 2005 Australian short film by Anthony Maras
 Azadi Empire, a fictional state in the 2006 video game Dreamfall
 Azadistan, a fictional state in the 2007 anime series Mobile Suit Gundam 00
 Ryder Azadi, the former governor of the fictional planet Lothal in the animated TV series Star Wars Rebels

Bangladesh 
 Gano Azadi League, political party in Bangladesh
 The Azadi, a newspaper published in Chittagong, Bangladesh

Iran 
 Azadistan was a short-lived state in the Iranian province of Azarbaijan under Mohammad Khiabani
 Bahare Azadi, a national gold coin issued in Iran
 Simaye Azadi, a satellite television channel covering issues relating to Iran
 Kashmir Jashn-e-Azadi, a film by Sanjay Kak covering issues related to Indian Administrated Kashmir

Pakistan 
 Azadi (album), fourth studio album by the Pakistani band Junoon
 Azadi (song), from the album Andaz by Junoon

Turkey 
 Azadî, Kurdish organization

Persian words and phrases
Bengali words and phrases